Ronald 'Ron' Turner (born 1945) is an Australian rugby league footballer who played in the 1970s. A New South Wales state and Australia national representative , he played in Sydney's New South Wales Rugby Football League premiership for the Cronulla-Sutherland and Newtown clubs.

Playing career
Originally from Gunnedah, New South Wales, Ron Turner joined the Cronulla-Sutherland Sharks in 1970. He became the Shark's first Australian representative player when he was selected for the 1970 World Cup tour of England, and is listed on the Australian Players Register as Kangaroo No. 447. Turner played hooker in the World Cup Final in which Australia defeated England at Leeds.

Turner represented New South Wales on one occasion in 1972. He played in the courageous Cronulla-Sutherland Sharks side that played in the 1973 NSWRFL season's Grand Final against Manly-Warringah. In 1974 Turner made his one test appearance when he played for the Kangaroos in the final Ashes Test against England, and also Ron Turner retired in 1976 after spending his final season with Newtown.

References

1945 births
Living people
Australia national rugby league team players
Australian rugby league players
Cronulla-Sutherland Sharks players
Newtown Jets players
New South Wales rugby league team players
Rugby league hookers
Rugby league players from New South Wales